Ardud is a town situated in Satu Mare County, Transylvania, Romania. It administers five villages: Ardud-Vii, Baba Novac, Gerăușa, Mădăras and Sărătura.

History
It has a complex history, having in different periods been part the Kingdom of Hungary, Ottoman Empire, Habsburg monarchy and the Kingdom of Romania.

In 1920 the town became part of Romania, under the Treaty of Trianon that concluded World War I. As a result of the Second Vienna Award it became a part of Hungary between 1940 and 1945. Since then it has been part of Romania.

Demographics

The 2011 census recorded a total population of 5,889. Of these, 59.2% were Romanians, 18.6% Hungarians, 16.1% Roma and 4.8% Germans. In 2002, 41.7% were Romanian Orthodox, 32.7% Roman Catholic, 13.9% Greek-Catholic, 5.1% Pentecostal, 4.2% Reformed and 2.3% Baptist.

Notable residents
 Sándor Petőfi to Júlia Szendrey married in Ardud.
 Ardud is the hometown of Hungarian archbishop, cardinal and statesman Tamás Bakócz.

International relations

Ardud is twinned with:
 Trevoux (1990)
 La Martyre (1992)
 Szakoly (2004)
 Napkor (2005)
 Velyki Berehy (2005)

References

Towns in Romania
Populated places in Satu Mare County
Erdődy family